Maissa Bigué Ngoné Fall or Ma Isa Bige Ngone Fall (Gambian English: Ma Isa Begay Ngoneh Faal; other spelling: Isa Bige N'Gone) was the King of the Wolof Kingdom of Cayor during the 18th century. Cayor is now part of modern Senegal. He reigned as Damel from 1748—1749 and again from 1758—1759. 

In 1759, the Bourba Jolof (king of Jolof) Birayamb Ma-Dyigen Ndaw Njie (or Birayamb-Madjiguène N'Dao N'Diaye) defeated Maissa Bigué in battle and exiled him. However, his victory was short-lived, because the following year, Maissa Bigué returned and defeated the King of Jolof, killing him in battle. Maissa Bigué belonged to the reigning Fall Wolof patrilineage and the "Wolof Géej maternal dynasty " of Cayor and Baol, and a direct maternal descendant of the Wolof noble Lingeer Ngoné Dièye, the matriarch of the maternal dynasty of "Géej." Ngoné Dieye ( Jéey in Wolof) was originally from Tubé Dieye in Gandiol, a Wolof region that borders Mauritania.

See also
Teign
Maad a Sinig
Maad Saloum

References

External links
World Statesmen

Senegalese royalty
Year of death unknown
Year of birth unknown
Gambian royalty
Wolof people
Matriarchy
18th-century rulers in Africa